Tenango (Nahuatl: "place of walls" or "walled place") may mean:

Tenango del Aire, Edomex 
Tenango de Arista, in the municipality of Tenango del Valle, Edomex
 Battle of Tenango del Valle
Tenango, Chiapas
Tenango, Morelos
Tenango de Doria, Hidalgo
 Tenango embroidery
Tenango de las Flores, Puebla
"Río Tenango", alternate name of the Amatzinac River 
San José Tenango, Oaxaca
San Miguel Tenango, Oaxaca
Santiago Tenango, Oaxaca

As a compound, in Guatemala we can find:
 Alotenango
 Chichicastenango
 Chimaltenango
 Colotenango
 Huehuetenango
 Jacaltenango
 Jocotenango
 Mazatenango
 Momostenango
 Quetzaltenango